Tim Leissner (born October 31, 1971) is a German-born investment banker and a former managing director at Goldman Sachs and chairman of the bank's Southeast Asia division. Leissner helped orchestrate the 1Malaysia Development Berhad scandal, one of the biggest financial scandals in history, in which billions of dollars were stolen. He was arrested in June 2018 in Washington, D.C.

In 2018 Leissner pled guilty to charges he personally stole $200 million from a Malaysian sovereign wealth fund 1 Malaysia Development Berhad (1MDB) and that he broke the Foreign Corrupt Practices Act (FCPA) by paying bribes to corrupt Malaysian and Emirati offices to get Goldman Sachs business. 

Leissner was banned for life by the Securities and Exchange Commission and forced to pay a $43 million fine. Leissner faces up to 25 years in prison. He testified against his former deputy Roger Ng in a 2022 trial.

Leissner is portrayed in the book "Billion Dollar Whale: The Man Who Fooled Wall Street, Hollywood, and the World" by Tom Wright and Bradley Hope of The Wall Street Journal, which focuses on Jho Low, the purported mastermind behind the 1MDB scheme. The book was published in September 2018.

Career 

Leissner was employed by Goldman Sachs from 1998 to 2016. He retired in January 2016 after an internal review found he sent a fake letter to Banque Havilland on behalf of Jho Low. 

In 2022, Bloomberg called Leissner "Goldman's most notorious banker." 

Goldman paid a record fine (over $5 billion) to the Malaysian and U.S. authorities over the scandal.

Personal life 
In 2014 Leissner married Kimora Lee Simmons. They have 1 child together. 

At the time Leissner married Simmons, he was still married to his ex-wife, Judy Chan. Leissner gave Simmons photoshopped documents showing that he was divorced from Chan, and created an email address in Chan's name to convince Simmons that the couple was divorced. He continued the correspondence for over a year and continued using the email account for several years.

References

Living people
1971 births
American investment bankers
Goldman Sachs people
German expatriates in the United States
German money launderers